The 1934 East Tennessee State Teachers football team was an American football team that represented East Tennessee State Teacher's College, Johnson City—now known as East Tennessee State University (ETSU)—as a member of the Smoky Mountain Conference in the 1934 college football season. They were led by third-year head coach Gene McMurray. The 1934 team had a total of 40 players with 13 returning lettermen. Despite a 3–3–2 record, they finished third in the conference. One of the most memorable moments was the Thanksgiving afternoon game with  before a record-setting crowd at the new Roosevelt Stadium, though East Tennessee lost 14–0. Seniors Pryor Hunt and Lynn Massengill were considered "best players to ever play their positions at T.C." according to Berney Burelson.

Schedule

References

East Tennessee State Teachers
East Tennessee State Buccaneers football seasons
East Tennessee State Teachers football